Mad Dogs may refer to:

Entertainment
 Mad Dogs (novel), a 2007 crime novel by Robert Muchamore
 Mad Dogs (British TV series), a 2011 psychological thriller
 Mad Dogs (American TV series), a partial remake of the British series

Sports
The Mad Dogs, a Japanese wrestling team
Madison Mad Dogs, an indoor football team from Madison, Wisconsin
Massachusetts Mad Dogs, an American independent baseball team from Lynn, Massachusetts
Memphis Mad Dogs, a short-lived Canadian Football League team in Memphis, Tennessee

See also
Mad Dog (disambiguation)
Rabid Dogs, a film